Ficus celebensis, the weeping fig or willow-leaved fig, is a species of flowering plant in the family Moraceae, endemic to the Minahasa Peninsula of Sulawesi. A tree reaching , it is rare on its native island, but is occasionally planted as an ornamental elsewhere, such as Hong Kong, Singapore, and Australia.

References

celebensis
Endemic flora of Sulawesi
Plants described in 1960